Emdadul Haque Bhuiyan is a Bangladesh Awami League politician and the former Member of Parliament of Narayanganj-2.

Career
Bhuiyan was elected to parliament from Narayanganj-2 as a Bangladesh Awami League candidate in 1996.

References

Awami League politicians
Living people
7th Jatiya Sangsad members
People from Narayanganj District
Year of birth missing (living people)